Notomatachia is a genus of South Pacific intertidal spiders that was first described by Raymond Robert Forster in 1970.  it contains only three species, all found in New Zealand: N. cantuaria, N. hirsuta, and N. wiltoni.

References

Araneomorphae genera
Desidae
Spiders of New Zealand
Taxa named by Raymond Robert Forster